JED is a text editor that makes extensive use of the S-Lang library. It is highly cross-platform compatible; JED runs on Windows and all flavors on Linux and Unix. Older versions are available for DOS. It is also very lightweight (meaning very parsimonious in its use of system resources), which makes it an ideal editor for older systems, embedded systems, etc. JED's Emacs mode is one of the most faithful emulations available.

Features
From the JED homepage:
Color syntax highlighting on color terminals
Code folding support
Drop-down menus on all terminals and platforms
Emulates editors Emacs, EDT, WordStar, Borland, Brief
Extensible in the C-like language S-Lang, making the editor highly customizable
Can read Texinfo (GNU info) files from within JED's info browser
A variety of programming modes (with syntax highlighting) are available including C, C++, Fortran, TeX, HTML, sh,  Perl, Python, IDL, DCL, nroff, more
Edits TeX files with AUC-TeX style editing, BibTeX support
Asynchronous subprocess support allowing one to compile from within the editor
Built-in support for the GPM mouse driver on Linux console
Abbreviation and dynamic abbreviation modes
8-bit clean with mute/dead key support
Rectangular cut/paste; regular expressions; incremental searches; search replace across multiple files; multiple windows; multiple buffers; shell modes; directory editor (dired); mail; rmail; ispell; and much, much more.
Variants:
"jed" is the name of the console version, whether for the Windows command-box, or for any Unix-like console.
"xjed" is a thin GUI wrapper for X.
"wjed" is a thin GUI wrapper for MS Windows.

References

External links

http://www.paneura.com/~dino/wjed.html Maintains wjed (i.e. jed packaged in a Windows installer). Current recommended stable release package is jed_0.99.18-s2.0.6-i154.exe
The traditional home for 3rd-party editing-modes and other S-lang extensions is at http://jedmodes.sourceforge.net/.  Many of the files are bundled into the Debian package jed-extra.
A separate, more recent set of tools, editing-modes and helpfiles is at the "RED Project", aka "Revisited jED".  Most of these files are omni-platform, but Dino's ms-Windows version is specifically supported: easier font/size changes, batfile support, etc.  That site also has a page detailing obtaining/compiling on various platforms, including instructions to get it working on Minix3.

Free text editors
Free software programmed in C
Software that uses S-Lang
DOS text editors
OpenVMS text editors
Software using the GPL license